Walter Bockmayer (4 July 1948 – 7 October 2014) was a German film director, screenwriter and actor. He directed seven films between 1975 and 1988. His 1978 film Flaming Hearts was entered into the 28th Berlin International Film Festival. He died of lung cancer in 2014.

Selected filmography
Director
 (1977)
Flaming Hearts (1978) (Deutscher Filmpreis: Filmband in Silber (Enten-Produktion))
 (1981) (Deutscher Filmpreis: Filmband in Gold)
 (1983)
 (1988)
Actor
In a Year of 13 Moons (1978), as Seelenfrieda
Im Himmel ist die Hölle los (1984), as Marianne Sommer
 (1988), as Christel von der Post

References

External links

1948 births
2014 deaths
People from Pirmasens
Film people from Rhineland-Palatinate
German male film actors
20th-century German male actors
German screenwriters
German male screenwriters
Best Director German Film Award winners
Deaths from lung cancer in Germany